Western Carolina University (WCU) is a public university in Cullowhee, North Carolina. It is part of the University of North Carolina system.

The fifth oldest institution of the sixteen four-year universities in the UNC system, WCU was founded to educate the people of the western North Carolina mountains. WCU provides an education to students from 48 states and 35 countries. Enrollment for the Fall 2020 semester was 12,243 students.

History

In 1888, the residents of Cullowhee desired a better school for the community than was offered in public schools of that day, organized a board of trustees
and established a community school that came to be known as Cullowhee Academy. Founded in August 1889 as a semi-public secondary school and chartered as Cullowhee High School in 1891 (also called Cullowhee Academy), it served the Cullowhee community and boarding students from neighboring counties and other states. The founder, Robert Lee Madison, wanted to provide an education for the young people in the region and train teachers to spread education throughout the western part of the state. In 1893, through the efforts of Walter E. Moore,
representative from Jackson County, the North Carolina Legislature authorized an appropriation for the establishment of a normal department at the school "for the purpose of training teachers". This designation became the first publicly funded normal school in North Carolina.

In 1905, the state assumed title to the school's buildings and property and made it a state institution. That same year, the school's name was changed to Cullowhee Normal & Industrial School. In 1925, the school's name was changed to Cullowhee State Normal School. During its years as Cullowhee Normal, the stated purpose of the school was to train teachers for the North Carolina public schools. A coeducational institution, Cullowhee Normal trained over two thousand teachers by the mid-1920s.

Over the next forty years, the school expanded its curriculum and evolved into a junior college, and in 1929 it was chartered by the Legislature as a four-year institution under the name Western Carolina Teachers College. Called "the Cullowhee experiment", Madison's idea became a model for the other regional colleges in the state.

The demand for both liberal arts and other programs led to an expansion of the school's offerings. Postgraduate studies and the Master of Arts in Education degree were added to the curriculum in 1951. In 1953, the name Western Carolina College was adopted.

In 1967, the institution was designated a regional university by the North Carolina General Assembly and given its current name, Western Carolina University. On July 1, 1972, WCU became a member of the University of North Carolina system.

Precis of the university's history

Campuses

Western Carolina University is located in Jackson County, in the unincorporated village of Cullowhee, North Carolina. The university operates learning centers in both Asheville and Cherokee with programs offered online and at various community colleges. The university lies close to the Great Smoky Mountains National Park, the Blue Ridge Parkway, the Eastern Band of Cherokee Indians Reservation (officially known as the Qualla Boundary), and some of the nation's most beautiful national forest lands. Cullowhee typically enjoys a rather mild winter season. In fact, Cullowhee can go some winters with little to no snowfall.

While winters in the valley are generally mild, snow is not unusual in the higher elevations of Jackson County around Cashiers or Balsam. In nearby Sapphire Valley, snowmaking machines maintain prime snow skiing conditions from mid-December through February. Locations in Jackson County are also within reasonable driving distance to ski slopes at Maggie Valley. The Blue Ridge Parkway is usually closed during winter weather, and has become popular with cross-country skiers during those times.

The many rivers, streams and forests surrounding Cullowhee, combined with the mild climate of Southern Appalachia, offer many opportunities for outdoor activities. Climbing, hiking, biking, rafting, kayaking, and camping are a few of the outdoor activities nearby. Cities within a three-hour drive of campus include Atlanta, Georgia; Charlotte, North Carolina; Knoxville, Tennessee; and Greenville, South Carolina.

Main campus in Cullowhee

The main campus in Cullowhee offers most of the amenities of a small town, including twelve residence halls, two full-service cafeterias, a food court with fast-food outlets, health services, counseling, a bookstore, library, a swimming pool, tennis and basketball courts, movie theater, jogging trail and quarter-mile track, hiking and biking trails and intramural fields.

The campus center is the A.K. Hinds University Center.  The UC contains the university post office, a movie theater, video and commuter lounges, student organization HQs including the Student Government Association and Last Minute Productions, meeting rooms and office spaces.  Outside of the UC is the "Alumni Tower", built in 1989, on the 100th birthday of the university. Other newly constructed facilities include the Center for Applied Technology (which houses new engineering laboratories); an expanded student life center; new athletic facilities; and a new student support center.

A $13.5 million  Student Recreation Center, was completed over the summer of 2008. Harrill Residence Hall was renovated to add 6,000 square feet (557 m2) and bring the 1971 building to LEED standards of environmental friendliness and energy efficiency, and re-opened in fall 2012.

The new $46.2 million Health and Human Sciences Building opened for use at the start of the 2012–13 academic year, also built to LEED standards. This facility is the first project on the Millennial Initiative property and houses WCU's educational and outreach programs in the College of Health and Human Sciences. The four-story facility is home to the undergraduate and graduate programs in social work and communication sciences and disorders; graduate programs in physical therapy and health sciences; and undergraduate programs in athletic training, emergency medical care, environmental health, nutrition and dietetics, nursing and recreational therapy.

Asheville campus
WCU's educational facilities in Asheville focus on professional and graduate degrees for working students.

Cherokee campus
The Western Carolina University Cherokee Center in Cherokee, North Carolina, was established in 1975 in cooperation with the tribal government of the Eastern Band of the Cherokee Indians. The center serves Cherokee and the surrounding communities and is available to all of the people of the region. Their services include the application process, transcript request, scholarships, internships placement, high school recruitment.

Organization and administration

The university is led by Chancellor Kelli R. Brown, the chief administrative officer, along with Interim Provost and Vice Chancellor for Academic Affairs Richard Starnes and several advisory groups. The institution operates under the guidance and policies of the Board of Trustees of Western Carolina University. WCU also falls under the administration of University of North Carolina system president Thomas W. Ross.  The university moved to a provost and senior vice chancellor model in 2004.

University media
The university produces the following publications and broadcasts:
 Western Carolina Magazine]: A seasonal publication primarily for alumni and friends of WCU, Western Carolina Magazine contains features on university people and programs, alumni updates, and news and events.
 Inside WCU: A weekly electronic newsletter for the faculty and staff of WCU, The Reporter features news, events and campus community updates.
 MountainRise: An open, peer-reviewed, international electronic journal published twice a year by the Coulter Faculty Center for Excellence in Teaching & Learning at Western Carolina University for the purpose of being an international vehicle for the Scholarship of Teaching & Learning (SoTL).
 All-Western Carolina: The All-Western Carolina radio program airs during half-time of Catamount Sports Network broadcasts and highlights WCU's academic all-stars and happenings on campus.

WCU students, faculty and staff also contribute to:
WCU on iTunes U Faculty and students are podcasting using WCU on iTunes U service from Apple Inc. This media repository was publicly listed on the iTunes U Colleges and Universities listings in August 2009.

Academics and research

Academic structure
Western Carolina University's academic programs are housed in six colleges: Arts and Sciences, Business, Education and Allied Professions, David Orr Belcher College of Fine and Performing Arts, Health and Human Sciences, and Engineering and Technology. WCU also has an Honors College and Graduate School, and offers several interdisciplinary programs.

Academic programs
With its main campus located on the site of an ancient Cherokee Indian village and adjacent to the Great Smoky and Blue Ridge Mountains, Western Carolina has a commitment to the rich traditions of both the Appalachian and Cherokee cultures. The university's Mountain Heritage Center; Cherokee Center; Craft Revival Project; Cherokee Studies Program and WCU's partnership to preserve the Cherokee language all reflect that influence – and provide educational resources for the region.

Western is classified among "M1: Master's Colleges and Universities – Larger programs" and in the elective "community engagement" category. WCU is accredited by the Commission on Colleges of the Southern Association of Colleges and Schools to award degrees at the bachelor, masters, intermediate, and doctoral levels. The university holds 21 program accreditations and is a member of more than 30 state and national associations and organizations to which its professional programs are related. In 2009, the Corporation for National and Community Service recognized WCU by awarding the President's Higher Education Community Service Honor Roll with Distinction for "exemplary commitment to service and civic engagement" on WCU's campus and beyond.

As the sixth-largest producer of teachers in North Carolina, the College of Education and Allied Professions was the national winner of the Association of Teacher Educators' Distinguished Program in Teacher Education Award in 2006.  The college is also the 2007 co-winner of the Christa McAuliffe Excellence in Teacher Education Award presented by the American Association of State Colleges and Universities. The Christa McAuliffe Award nationally recognizes outstanding programs in teacher education at AASCU member institutions.

Western Carolina's Forensic Research Facility (commonly referred to as the "FoREST") is just the second facility of its kind nationally. The decomposition research station is an extremely valuable resource for researchers and forensic anthropology students to study natural decomposition.

The residential Honors College was first of its kind in North Carolina. Newly accepted students are invited to live in one of two exclusive residence halls on campus. The Honors College is one of a few in the state to offer a residential option and among a few nationwide to award graduates with a special honors diploma. The college began in 1998 with 77 students and has grown to approximately 1,400. For entering freshman, the Honor's College average weighted GPA is over 4.00 and the average SAT score is 1380.  The college is a member of the National Collegiate Honors Council.  In August 2009, Balsam Hall, the first part of a $50.2 million Honors College residential community located at the center of campus opened, housing 426 students. In Fall 2010, Blue Ridge Hall completed the community and add an additional 400 beds for Honors College students and Teaching Fellows.

In the spring of 2000, WCU was officially designated a National Merit sponsoring university, just the fourth institution of higher education in North Carolina, public or private, to receive that distinction  The university grants scholarships to students who qualify as National Merit Finalists. The Western Meritorious Award for Finalists provides a four-year scholarship, which covers the equivalent amount of in-state tuition, fees, room, and board, to National Merit Finalists, who also receive a computer.

The 2012 edition of the U.S. News & World Report guide to "America's Best Colleges" ranks Western Carolina University 14th  among public universities in the South that offer master's degrees.

In 2015, the North Carolina General Assembly approved the NC Promise Tuition Plan, a tuition reduction plan to make three universities  - WCU, Elizabeth City State University, and University of North Carolina at Pembroke - more affordable and accessible. The NC Promise began in the fall semester of 2018 and drastically reduces the tuition cost for students. In-state students pay $500 a semester and out-of-state students pay $2,500 a semester. Attendance has increased for three consecutive years with the total attendance as of Fall 2020 at 12,243 students, being the ninth time in the past ten years record enrollment has been recorded.

Centers, institutes, and affiliates
Community focus, economic development, scholarly research, business development, preservation of the Cherokee & Appalachian Mountain cultures, and the advancement of technology & public policy are the guiding foci of Western Carolina's Centers, Institutes & Affiliates.
Center for Rapid Product Realization
Carolinas MicroOptics Triangle
Carolinas Photonics Consortium
Center for Study of Free Enterprise (CSFE) 
Corporation for Entrepreneurship and Innovation (CEI)
Center of Professional Selling and Marketing
Mathematics Tutoring Center
Cherokee Studies
Projects and Initiatives from Cherokee Studies
Cherokee Studies Academic Programs
Cherokee Center
Revitalization of Traditional Cherokee Artisan Resources
John W. Bardo Fine & Performing Arts Center
Center for the Support of Beginning Teachers
Mountain Heritage Center
The Public Policy Institute
Ramsey Regional Activities Center
Small Business & Technology Development Center partner
Writing and Learning Commons
Program for the Study of Developed Shorelines
Speech and Hearing Clinic
Myron L. Coulter Faculty Commons for Excellence in Teaching and Learning
Southern Appalachian Biodiversity and Ecology Center
Center for Service Learning and Community Engagement
Local Government Training Program
Mountain Area Pro Bono Health Care

Student life

Residential life
The main campus at Cullowhee has residential facilities for students. These include twelve residence halls, two full-service cafeterias, and one food court with fast-food outlets. The halls house more than 4,500 WCU students each academic year.

The campus residence buildings include one for graduate students, named Madison Hall, and one for married students. Special residence accommodations include honors residence halls and The Village, home to residential Greek and student organizations. Three new residence facilities were recently completed from a $50.2 million residence hall project. The newest residence halls are referred to as “The Rocks”. They consist of three buildings, Black Rock, Shining Rock, and Water Rock. They were all fully opened in Spring of 2023 and are located in place of former Scott and walker residence halls.

Athletics

As a member of the Southern Conference, Western Carolina University participates in NCAA Division I athletics.  Intercollegiate athletics include football, men and women's basketball, baseball, softball, women's soccer, men and women's golf, men and women's track and field (Indoor and Outdoor), cross country running, women's volleyball and tennis. Catamount football is a member of Division I FCS and plays at Whitmire Stadium. The Ramsey Center is home to men's and women's basketball, and women's volleyball. Baseball is played at Hennon Stadium, softball is played at the Catamount Softball Complex, and the Catamount Athletic Complex is home to women's soccer, tennis, and track and field.

On November 29, 1980, Western Carolina's Ronnie Carr made the first intercollegiate three-point field goal, in a game against Middle Tennessee State University, a game WCU won 77–70. The ball he used is on display at the Basketball Hall of Fame in Springfield, Massachusetts.

Western Carolina and Appalachian State have a football rivalry in which they once competed in the Battle for the Old Mountain Jug on an annual basis. The Catamounts football team was runner-up in the Division I-AA National Football Championship Game in 1983.

Current NCAA sports at WCU include:
 Men - Baseball, Basketball, Cross Country, Football, Golf, Track and Field
 Women - Basketball, Cross Country, Golf, Soccer, Softball, Tennis, Track and Field, Volleyball

In 2016 the WCU dance team won third place at the NDA Nationals dance competition, performing in Daytona Beach, Florida.

Music

Concerts and recitals
The Schools of Music and Fine and Performing Arts offer a variety of events featuring students, faculty, and outside performers. These cultural opportunities are typically relatively cheap, and students can often attend them free of charge.

Pride of the Mountains

The Pride of the Mountains is the largest college marching band in the Carolinas and Tennessee. As of Fall 2014, the marching band includes just over 500 members, making it one of the largest marching bands in the United States.  The band is open to all Western Carolina students regardless of class or major, with approximately 60% of its members non-music majors.

In 2014, the band performed in the Macy's Thanksgiving Day Parade with 510 band members participating. Announcers described their performance as "This is the largest band this parade has seen in decades", "This is the best of the best", and "They don't mess around at Western Carolina".

The Pride of the Mountains also performed at a Carolina Panthers halftime show in 2011. The band was also the special guest at the Bands of America Grand National Championships in Indianapolis in 1998, 2003, 2008 and 2012, an honor given to only one college band in the United States each year. In addition, the band was also a special guest at the Bands of America Regional's held in Atlanta in 1995, 2006, 2010, and 2011.  In 2009, the Pride of the Mountains was selected as one of the five best collegiate marching bands in the nation by the College Band Directors National Association and featured in the book "Marching Bands and Drumlines: Secrets of Success from the Best of the Best" by Paul Buyer.

The band is the 2009 recipient of the Sudler Trophy awarded by the John Philip Sousa Foundation. They participated in the 2011 Tournament of Roses Parade in Pasadena, California, and won the most votes in a "best band" in the parade poll hosted by KTLA-TV.

Greek life
WCU is home to a wide range of Greek fraternities and sororities, as well as several councils and societies. The Greek community offers many social opportunities to enrich college life. Greeks get personal guidance in planning their curriculum and choosing classes and instructors, and assistance with registration and financial aid. Chapter study sessions, educational programs, tutoring, and study partners and teams offer support for developing and maintaining study skills. Greeks are recognized for their academic successes through Greek scholarship and awards programs and honor societies such as the Order of Omega. According to 2011–12 figures from U.S. News & World Report, 3.4% of WCU's male undergraduate students are in fraternities, while 3.6% of female undergraduate students are in sororities.

WCU student media
Housed in the Student Media Center (Old Student Union) on the hill area of campus are WCU's Student Media Organizations, which are open to all students and are produced by students.
The following organizations are a part of WCU Student Media:
WWCU-FM: WWCU-FM, Power 90.5, is the broadcast service of WCU and broadcasts 24 hours a day, 7 days a week as Jackson County's only FM radio station.
 WCAT: Cable & Internet radio station offering an eclectic mix of music chosen by student DJs, as well as original talk shows and artist interviews. It broadcasts on the campus closed-circuit television station 22.
 TV 62: The student-run campus television station, offering original programing to the campus on channel 62. It is WCU's closed-circuit television station with offices located in the A.K. Hinds University Center, an organization offering original programming that allows students to showcase their short films, as well as announce events on campus and highlight recent sporting events.
 The Nomad: WCU's Literature & Art magazine, published once a year in the Spring semester. Student staff members work together to compile student fiction, poetry, and art and distribute them at on-campus events.
 The Gadfly: WCU's Journal of Social Criticism and Philosophy. Satirical pieces philosophically critiquing society-at-large in a humorous manner. Published once a semester.
 Western Carolinian Newspaper: A bi-weekly newspaper focusing on news and events relevant to the campus and surrounding community. Includes News, Features, Sports, and Arts & Entertainment sections. Available in print in the local area and on-line at www.westerncarolinian.com.
 The Western Carolina Journalist: An online newspaper ran by the Communication department covering news about WCU and the surrounding areas
The Tuckasegee Valley Historical Review: The Tuckasegee Valley Historical Review is an annually published graduate history journal. The review publishes articles by WCU graduate students in history with a primarily local focus.

Notable people

Alumni

Gerald Austin – NFL referee
Bobbi Baker – actress, best known for her role as Kiki on the Tyler Perry sitcom House of Payne
James A. Beaty, Jr. – current U.S. District Judge and former nominee to the U.S. Court of Appeals for the Fourth Circuit
Dean Biasucci – athlete (former placekicker, NFL Indianapolis Colts), actor
Linda L. Bray – first female in the military to lead troops into combat
Sean Bridgers – actor, writer, director, producer
Andrew C. Brock – North Carolina State Senator
Jared Burton – retired MLB pitcher
Keion Crossen - cornerback, Miami Dolphins
Geoff Collins - former head football coach at Georgia Tech
Louis Cooper – NFL linebacker
Jeanelle Coulter Moore – First Lady of North Carolina
Ariana DeBose – Academy Award Winning actress, singer, and dancer
Ryan Dorsey - actor
Louis Ducruet- scout at AS Monaco FC, 12th in line to the Monégesque throne, grandson to Rainier III, Prince of Monaco and American actress Grace Kelly
Carol Fowler Durham – professor of Nursing at University of North Carolina at Chapel Hill, interprofessional teams expert
Joe Firstman – musician and musical director
Ernest A. Fitzgerald (1947) – bishop of the United Methodist Church
Judy Green – head volleyball coach for the University of Alabama
Mel Gibson – former basketball player for the Los Angeles Lakers
Rich Hall – comedian, writer
Greg Holland – MLB pitcher and MLB All-Star
Brad Hoover – former fullback for the NFL Carolina Panthers
Frank Huguelet – retired professional wrestler (as "'Heavy Metal' Ric Savage'"), television host
Sarah Hutchings – Composer
Paul Johnson – former head football coach at Georgia Tech
Jeanne Jolly – singer, songwriter
Tony Jones – football player with the Cleveland Browns, Baltimore Ravens, and Denver Broncos
Andrew Jordan – tight end in the NFL
David Joy – author
Keith LeClair – athlete and baseball coach at Western Carolina University
Henry Logan – athlete; in 1964 became North Carolina's first African-American collegiate athlete, and the first to play basketball for a "white" public institution in 1964
Kevin Martin – professional basketball player
Manteo Mitchell – track and field athlete, 2012 London Olympic medalist
Nick McNeil – former NFL player, WWE professional wrestler (as '"Showtime!' Percy Watson")
Mary Cordell Nesbitt – politician
David Patten – NFL wide receiver
Dave Pember – former pitcher for MLB Milwaukee Brewers
J. T. Poston - professional golfer
Rachel Reilly – reality television show contestant, television host
David Sedaris – humorist, comedian, author, and radio contributor
Geno Segers – former professional rugby player, actor.
Clyde Simmons – defensive end for the NFL Philadelphia Eagles
Tim Sinicki – head baseball coach at intercollegiate Binghamton
Drew Starkey - actor
Matt Stillwell – Nashville recording artist
Wayne Tolleson – Major League Baseball player 1981-1990
Hedy West – American folk singer
Willie Williams – NFL defensive back for Pittsburgh Steelers and Seattle Seahawks

Faculty
Robert J. Conley – award-winning author
Terrence Mann – stage actor, director, singer, songwriter, and dancer
Ron Rash – award-winning author
Matt Rhule - head coach, Nebraska Cornhuskers
Laura Wright – founder of academic field of vegan studies

References

External links

Western Carolina Athletics website

 
Educational institutions established in 1889
Education in Jackson County, North Carolina
Universities and colleges accredited by the Southern Association of Colleges and Schools
Public universities and colleges in North Carolina
University of North Carolina
Education in Asheville, North Carolina
Education in Swain County, North Carolina
Buildings and structures in Jackson County, North Carolina
1889 establishments in North Carolina